Vusi Tshepo Sibiya (born 14 June 1994) is a South African soccer player who plays as a defender for South African Premier Division side Stellenbosch.

Club career
Born in Soshanguve, Sibiya signed for Baroka in 2018 after playing for Tshwane University of Technology.

International career
He made his debut for South Africa national soccer team on 14 July 2021 in a 2021 COSAFA Cup game against Zambia. South Africa won the tournament, with Sibiya's only appearance coming against Zambia.

References

1994 births
Living people
People from the City of Tshwane Metropolitan Municipality
Soccer players from Gauteng
South African soccer players
South Africa international soccer players
Association football defenders
Baroka F.C. players
Stellenbosch F.C. players
South African Premier Division players